Petrof is a Czech piano manufacturer.

Petrof  may also refer to:
 Ivan Petrof, an American explorer of Alaska
 Antonín Petrof, founder of Petrov 
 Petrof Bay, a bay in southeastern Alaska
 USS Petrof Bay (CVE-80), a Casablanca class escort carrier of the US Navy from World War II

See also
 Petrov (disambiguation)